Reunion, also known as American Reunion, is a 2001 American film directed by Leif Tilden and Mark Poggi using the filmmaking techniques of Dogme 95 style. It stars Billy Wirth and Jennifer Rubin in a bittersweet tale about six former classmates gathering 24 hours before their 20th high school reunion. Reunion is listed as the 17th film to conform to the minimalist tenets of the Danish avant-garde school of Dogme.

Selected Cast
 Billy Wirth as Brad
 Jennifer Rubin as Jeanie
 Corey Glover as Ty
 Marlene Forte as Margaret
 Rainer Judd as Mindy
 Dwier Brown as Patrick
 Andres Faucher as J.C.
 Steven Gilborn as George
 Georgia Simon as Georgina
 Rod Britt as Mr. Andretti
 Dan Gunther as Kile
 Michael James Johnson as Michael

External links
 
 
Dogme 95 website list

2001 films
American independent films
Dogme 95 films
2000s English-language films
2000s American films